Manzoni is an Italian surname, and may refer to:

People

Academics
 Antonio Manzoni (1746-1819), Italian surgeon and anatomist from Verona
 Jean-Francois Manzoni (born 1961), French and Canadian academic, Dean of the IMD
 Luigi Manzoni, Italian professor and grape breeder who created the Incrocio Manzoni family of grapes

Arts
 Alessandro Manzoni (1785–1873), Italian poet and novelist
 Giacomo Manzoni (born 1932), Italian composer
 Giacomo Manzoni (1840–1912), Italian painter, active and exhibiting in the Veneto
 Giuseppe Manzoni (1742-1811), Italian writer and priest from Venice
 Ignazio Manzoni (1797–1884), Italian painter, active for many years in Buenos Aires
 Piero Manzoni (1933–1963), Italian artist
 Ridolfo Manzoni (1675-1745), Italian still-life painter from Castelfranco

Sports
 Alessio Manzoni (born 1987), Italian footballer
 Diego Manzoni (born 1990), Italian former footballer 
 Gloria Manzoni (born 1998), Italian road and track cyclist
 Mario Manzoni (born 1969), Italian former professional racing cyclist

Others
 Cherubino Manzoni O.F.M. (1595–1651), Roman Catholic prelate who served as Bishop of Termoli 
 Flavio Manzoni (born 1965), Italian architect and automobile designer
 Herbert Manzoni (1899–1972), British civil engineer and city planner
 Pablo Manzoni (born c.1940), Italian make-up artist

Astronomy 
 14103 Manzoni, a minor planet discovered by P. Sicoli and A. Testa in Sormano on October 1, 1997

Surnames of Italian origin